The 1972 Fidelity WCT Tournament – Doubles was an event of the 1972 Fidelity WCT Tournament men's tennis tournament played at the Richmond Coliseum in Richmond, Virginia in the United States from February 2 through February 6, 1972. The draw consisted of 14 teams players. Arthur Ashe and  Dennis Ralston were the defending doubles champions but did not compete together in this edition. Tom Okker and Marty Riessen won the doubles title, defeating John Newcombe and Tony Roche in the final, 7–6, 7–6.

Draw

References

External links
 ITF tournament edition details

Richmond WCT
Richmond WCT
Richmond WCT
Tennis in Virginia